The epithet the Pious may refer to:

Adalbert I, Count of Vermandois (c. 915/917–988)
Albert III, Duke of Bavaria (1401–1460)
Bolesław the Pious (1224/27–1279), Duke of Greater Poland and various other realms
Boleslaus II, Duke of Bohemia (died 999)
Ernest I, Duke of Saxe-Gotha (1601–1675), also Duke of Saxe-Altenburg
Frederick II, Duke of Brunswick-Lüneburg (1418–1478), also Prince of Lüneburg
Frederick III, Elector Palatine (1515–1576)
Henry II the Pious (c. 1196/1207–1241), Duke of Silesia and Duke of Kraków and thus High Duke of all Poland as well as Duke of Southern Greater Poland
John II, Duke of Cleves (died 1521)
John III of Portugal (1502–1557), King of Portugal and the Algarves
Judah he-Hasid (disambiguation) ("Judah the Pious"), two people
Louis the Pious (778–840), King of Acquitaine, King of the Franks, and co-Emperor (as Louis I) with his father, Charlemagne
Magnus I, Duke of Brunswick-Lüneburg (died 1369)
Maria I of Portugal (1734–1816), first undisputed Queen regnant of Portugal
Mikołaj Sapieha (1581–1644), Lithuanian Great Standard-Keeper, Voivode of Minsk, Voivode of Brześć Litewski, and castellan of Vilnius in the Polish-Lithuanian Commonwealth
Robert II of France (972–1031), King of France
Rudolph III of Burgundy (993–1032), last king of an independent Burgundy
Sigwin von Are (died 1089), Archbishop of Cologne
Simeon the Just (fl. third century), Jewish High Priest during the time of the Second Temple
Stanisław Radziwiłł (1559–1599), Great Lithuanian Marshal  
Sulpitius the Pious, seventh century Bishop of Bourges
William II of Provence (c. 987–1019), Count of Provence
William V, Duke of Bavaria (1548–1626)

See also
Leopold V, Duke of Austria (1157–1194), known as the Virtuous, also Duke of Styria

Lists of people by epithet